Oswaldo Fumeiro Alvarez (21 August 1956 – 25 May 2020), more commonly known as Vadão, was a Brazilian football manager. Although he managed several Brazilian men's teams over the course of his managerial career, he was best known for being the head coach of the Brazil women's national football team on two occasions, from 2014 to 2016, and from 2017 to 2019.

On 25 May 2020, Vadão died at the age of 63, with the cause of death being liver cancer.

Managerial statistics

Honours 
 XV de Piracicaba
 Campeonato Brasileiro Série C: 1995

 Atlético Paranaense
 Copa Libertadores Selective: 1999 
 Campeonato Paranaense: 2000

 São Paulo
 Torneio Rio-São Paulo: 2001

 Tokyo Verdy
 Japanese Super Cup: 2005

 Criciúma
 Campeonato Catarinense: 2013

 Brazil Women
 Copa América Femenina: 2014, 2018

References

External links

1956 births
2020 deaths
Brazilian football managers
Campeonato Brasileiro Série A managers
Campeonato Brasileiro Série B managers
J1 League managers
2015 FIFA Women's World Cup managers
Mogi Mirim Esporte Clube managers
Esporte Clube XV de Novembro (Piracicaba) managers
Guarani FC managers
Club Athletico Paranaense managers
Sport Club Corinthians Paulista managers
São Paulo FC managers
Associação Atlética Ponte Preta managers
Esporte Clube Bahia managers
Tokyo Verdy managers
Esporte Clube Vitória managers
Goiás Esporte Clube managers
Associação Desportiva São Caetano managers
Sport Club do Recife managers
Associação Portuguesa de Desportos managers
Criciúma Esporte Clube managers   
Brazil women's national football team managers
2019 FIFA Women's World Cup managers
Deaths from liver cancer